Lavina Sabastian Martins (born 3 February 1993) is a Kenyan badminton player. In 2015, she won the bronze medal at the African Games in women's doubles event. She also competed at the 2014 Commonwealth Games in Glasgow, Scotland.

Achievements

All-Africa Games 
Women's doubles

BWF International Challenge/Series
Mixed doubles

 BWF International Challenge tournament
 BWF International Series tournament
 BWF Future Series tournament

References

External links
 

1993 births
Living people
People from Kisumu County
Kenyan female badminton players
Badminton players at the 2014 Commonwealth Games
Commonwealth Games competitors for Kenya
Competitors at the 2011 All-Africa Games
Competitors at the 2015 African Games
Competitors at the 2019 African Games
African Games bronze medalists for Kenya
African Games medalists in badminton